Yattalunga is a south-eastern suburb of the Central Coast region of New South Wales, Australia. It is part of the  local government area.

References

Suburbs of the Central Coast (New South Wales)